The David Braley Athletic Centre, is an athletics facility located at the campus of McMaster University, in Hamilton, Ontario, Canada. Named after former Canadian senator David Braley, the facility was opened in 2007, with McMaster students paying a year-round membership fee to support the facility as part of their mandatory student union fees.

The  athletic facility features a  indoor rock climbing wall, Olympic weightlifting equipment, four internationally-sized squash courts, and a four-lane  indoor track.

History
The athletic centre was opened by McMaster University in 2007. The cost to build the facility was approximately C$31 million, with C$20 million originating from the university's student unions.

In 2018 the athletic centre was involved in an unsuccessful litigation filed by a former student for an alleged injury from using the facility. In May 2018, a jury panel of the Ontario Superior Court of Justice found the university not liable for any claims, with the decision later upheld by the Ontario Court of Appeal.

The indoor track was closed for construction in 2018 and scheduled to be reopened in 2020.

See also
 List of sports venues in Hamilton, Ontario

References

External links
 Facilities - McMaster Athletics & Recreation

Sports venues in Hamilton, Ontario
McMaster University